Sir Mark James Todd  (born 1 March 1956) is a New Zealand horseman noted for his accomplishments in the discipline of eventing, voted Rider of the 20th century by the International Federation for Equestrian Sports.
 
He won gold medals at Los Angeles (1984) and Seoul (1988) Olympics, the Badminton Horse Trials on four occasions, the Burghley Horse Trials five times, and as a member of New Zealand's Eventing team, he won gold medals at the World Championships in 1990 and 1998 (Rome), plus 20 or more other international events, and numerous other international individual and team titles.

In 1988, he was announced as the New Zealand Sportsperson of the year and winner of the Supreme Halberg Award. In the same year, he was inducted into the New Zealand Sports Hall of Fame.

On 25 April 2011, Todd completed a fourth Badminton victory riding NZB Land Vision, becoming the oldest winner of the event.

By winning his fifth Olympic medal at the 2012 Summer Olympics, Todd equalled the Olympic record established by Hungarian fencer Aladár Gerevich for the longest gap between first and last Olympic medals — 28 years — and shares the record for second-most Olympic medals won by a New Zealander with canoeists Ian Ferguson and Paul MacDonald. The 2016 Games were Todd's seventh, having previously competed in 1984, 1988, 1992, 2000, 2008 and 2012. Todd is the first New Zealander to have competed at seven Olympic Games.

In February of 2022, a video emerged of Todd repeatedly hitting a horse with a branch for refusing to enter a water obstacle at a training clinic.

Early life
Born in Cambridge, New Zealand, he developed a deep and abiding passion for horses. He rode at pony club as a youngster and competed at local shows.

Todd considered becoming a jockey but quickly grew to 6 ft 2 in which forced him into show jumping instead. In reference to his riding skills, fellow New Zealand team member, Andrew Nicholson, is quoted as saying "Mark can ride anything – he could go cross-country on a dairy cow!”

On leaving school Todd pursued a career as a farmer, gaining a Diploma of Agriculture at the Waikato Technical Institute, and working on farms while fitting in riding, competing and selling horses.

Equestrian career
In 1978, he was part of New Zealand's first three-day eventing team to contest a world championship, at Lexington, Kentucky, United States. He was 10th after the dressage and second in the steeplechase, but then his horse, Tophunter, broke down during the cross-country stage. Thereafter, Todd moved to England, where he mucked out stables and obtained use of horses for event rides. At his first attempt, in 1980, he won the Badminton Horse Trials riding Southern Comfort. Todd was a virtual unknown when he arrived, with fellow New Zealander Andrew Nicholson as his groom.

Todd is recognized as a pioneer of three-day eventing in New Zealand. His success was followed by fellow New Zealand Olympic medallists and world champions like Tinks Pottinger, Blyth Tait, Vaughn Jefferis, Vicky Latta, Sally Clark and Nicholson. Jefferis once said: "We all owe a huge debt to Mark Todd. He was the first, and he paved the way for us".

Career 
Todd became a popular sportsman in his home country and some of the horses he rode also became well-known. Most notable was Charisma, the  Thoroughbred (with 1/16 Percheron) Todd rode when winning successive Olympic gold medals in 1984 and 1988. Charisma was retired to a Waikato farm after the Seoul Olympics but appeared with Todd for later public appearances including flag bearing at the 1990 Commonwealth Games in Auckland New Zealand. Charisma died aged 30 from a broken shoulder.

In 1984 Todd borrowed a yard at Kington St Michael, Wiltshire, from his friend Charles Cottenham, so that he could base himself in England.

In the 1985 New Year Honours, Todd was appointed a Member of the Order of the British Empire, and he was elevated to Commander of the Order of the British Empire in the 1995 Queen's Birthday Honours.

Todd also competed at the Sydney 2000 Summer Olympics, where he won an individual bronze medal. His win was somewhat clouded by allegations in the Sunday Mirror that Todd had used cocaine with a homosexual partner prior to final team selection. The controversy was a matter of national debate, and almost cost Todd his team selection.

Retirement 
Todd retired from international competition following the Olympics and returned to live in New Zealand. Todd and his family moved to Rivermonte Farm near his home town of Cambridge in Waikato to breed horses and concentrate on several business ventures, including the manufacture/retail of harness and other tack. His Thoroughbreds enjoyed racing success, including wins in the Wellington Cup and New Zealand Oaks. He remained closely involved with the administration of the eventing, acting as coach for the NZ Olympic Eventing team at Athens in 2004. He continued to compete in eventing at a local level and to support the sport in general.

Comeback 
On 25 January 2008, Horse & Hound announced online that Mark Todd was to make a return to Eventing eight years after he retired in Sydney. He purchased a 10-year-old grey called Gandalf to campaign for selection to ride at the 2008 Summer Olympics. His comeback was sponsored by New Zealand Bloodstock.

On 19 May 2008, Todd placed sixth at a three-day equestrian event in Saumur, France. Subsequently, achieving qualification and selection for the Olympics, he put up one of the best performances of the NZ team, in what was only his eighth competition in eight years. The New Zealand team finished fifth, and Todd managed the second best individual performance for the team, coming in 17th overall.

Following Beijing, Todd competed for the inaugural Express Eventing International Cup on Gandalf. However, three refusals in the show jumping portion resulted in a poor placing. In February 2009, Todd announced that he was making a full return to elite level eventing, basing himself in England with a team of up to 8 horses including Gandalf.

Competing at the 2012 Summer Olympics, Todd became the second oldest New Zealand Olympian in history.

In the 2013 New Year Honours, Todd was appointed a Knight Companion of the New Zealand Order of Merit for services to equestrian sport. His investiture at Buckingham Palace in May 2013 took place only days after the death of his father, Norm.

Todd got selected to represent New Zealand at the 2016 Summer Olympics. Once again he became the second oldest New Zealand Olympian in history, as the fellow equestrian Julie Brougham made her Olympic debut at the age of 62. At the Games held in Rio de Janeiro, Brazil, Todd finished 4th in the team competition and 7th individually. Todd was the last team member to compete in the jumping phase, however, he uncharacteristically dropped four rails. As a result, New Zealand team missed out on a possible gold medal. Todd later described this outcome as one of the biggest lows of his career.

Viral video 
In February 2022, a two-year old video emerged of Todd hitting a horse with a tree branch at a training clinic. The horse had refused to enter a water obstacle, and Todd hit it ten times. Todd issued an apology after the video was published. The British Horseracing Authority (BHA) announced it was carrying out an investigation. In the interim, Todd was issued with a temporary suspension of his licence. Todd stepped down as a patron of the charity World Horse Welfare. Todd's training licence was returned to him on 14 April 2022 after an independent disciplinary panel issued him with a four month suspension with two months deferred, which meant that he had already served the eight-week suspension.

Partial CCI 5* Results

Partial International Championship results

Personal life 
Todd married Carolyn Berry in 1986 and had two children, Lauren and James. They separated in 2009. The couple remarried in 2014, with only their children present as witnesses.

Todd's autobiography, So Far, So Good, was published in 1998. He has had several other books published including Charisma (1989), One Day Eventing, Mark Todd’s Cross-Country Handbook (1995) and Novice Eventing with Mark Todd (1996). He has also produced a series of training videos.

References

Further reading
Todd, M., So Far, So Good: The Autobiography, 1998, Hodder Moa Beckett Publishers Limited, Auckland, New Zealand.
Romanos, J., Our Olympic Century. 2008, Trio Books Limited, Wellington New Zealand.

External links

 
 
 Biography at FEI.com
 Eventing Radio (2009 interview)

|-

1956 births
Living people
New Zealand event riders
Olympic gold medalists for New Zealand
Olympic silver medalists for New Zealand
Olympic bronze medalists for New Zealand
Olympic equestrians of New Zealand
New Zealand male equestrians
Equestrians at the 1984 Summer Olympics
Equestrians at the 1988 Summer Olympics
Equestrians at the 1992 Summer Olympics
Equestrians at the 2000 Summer Olympics
Equestrians at the 2008 Summer Olympics
Equestrians at the 2012 Summer Olympics
Equestrians at the 2016 Summer Olympics
Olympic medalists in equestrian
Medalists at the 2012 Summer Olympics
Sportspeople from Cambridge, New Zealand
New Zealand Commanders of the Order of the British Empire
Knights Companion of the New Zealand Order of Merit
Medalists at the 2000 Summer Olympics
Medalists at the 1988 Summer Olympics
Medalists at the 1984 Summer Olympics
New Zealand sportsmen
People in sports awarded knighthoods